Bodhsingh  Bhagat is an Indian politician of the Bharatiya Janata Party and Member of parliament in 16th Loksabha From Balaghat (Lok Sabha constituency).

He is a former member of Madhya Pradesh Legislative Assembly elected from Khairlanji constituency in Balaghat district. He is vice-president of the state unit Bharatiya Kisan Sangh.

He started his political career with being the Sarpanch of his village Ghubargondi. Bhagat broke the record and defeated a 4 time MLA and RPI Leader, minister of that time Doman Singh Nagpure.

He was in the controversy when he was at a feud with the ex Minister and MLA of Balaghat Gauri Shankar Bisen during a party program in Malanjkhand.

References

Living people
Bharatiya Janata Party politicians from Madhya Pradesh
People from Balaghat district
India MPs 2014–2019
Lok Sabha members from Madhya Pradesh
1955 births